José Luis Espert  (born 21 November 1961) is an Argentine economist and politician who is known to be one of the strongest supporters of the economic liberalism in Argentina.

Espert proposes to deepen the commercial opening with the world and attacks against the limitations of Mercosur. He is against the "corporations that devour the country": as an anti-system, he proposes that the country "change the system for another." With his ideology, he seeks to position himself as the only representative of liberalism. Espert considers himself a "common citizen", criticizes Mauricio Macri and Alberto Fernandez and claims to be the opposition figure to Kirchnerism.

Since 2021, he has been a National Deputy elected in Buenos Aires Province for the Avanza Libertad coalition.

Education and career
He was born in Pergamino to a Catalan father and an Argentine mother. His father, who died in 2018, was a prominent businessman linked to the rural sector.

He studied economics at the University of Buenos Aires (UBA). He earned a master's degree in economics at the University of CEMA (UCEMA), and a Master's in Statistics at the National University of Tucumán.

He started working at the Miguel Ángel Broda firm where he was a monetary policy analyst, later to become a chief economist at the same institution. He also worked as an econometrist at Estudio Arriazu firm and was a partner at Econométrica S.A. In 2000, he founded his own firm, Estudio Espert, which offers macroeconomic consultancy and Asset Management.

He is a member of the Argentine Association of Political Economy (Asociación Argentina de Economía Política). He was Econometrics professor at UBA and Public Finances professor at UCEMA.

He is a columnist in different newspapers, such as La Nación and El País from Uruguay. In 2015, he was interviewed by José del Río at a La Nación program, which became the second-most viewed interview of the year.

Politics

He is very critical of the economic policies of the second presidency of Carlos Menem and the governments of Fernando de la Rúa, Eduardo Duhalde, Néstor Kirchner, Cristina Fernández and Mauricio Macri.

In December 2018 he officially launched his presidential campaign for the 2019 Argentine general election.

Espert's proposals consist of lowering public spending, forming an agency similar to the US Drug Control Administration to combat drug trafficking, lowering taxes, decriminalizing personal marijuana use, decriminalizing abortion and reforming the education system through school vouchers.

He opposes industrial promotion regimes and believes that the right to strike has gone too far, harmed even the worker himself. Therefore, he seeks a labor, tax and state reform in general. He also showed himself in favor of privatizing inefficient state companies and the retirement system, to turn it into an individual capitalization system such as in Chile.

Espert signed the Madrid Charter, a document drafted by the conservative Spanish political party Vox that describes left-wing groups as enemies of Ibero-America involved in a "criminal project" that are "under the umbrella of the Cuban regime".

Electoral history

Executive

Legislative

Books 
 Argentina Devoured (La Argentina Devorada) (2017)
 The Complicit Society (La Sociedad Cómplice) (2019)
 Invisible Chains (Cadenas Invisibles) (2021)

References

External links 
 Official site

Argentine people of Catalan descent
Argentine libertarians
Argentine economists
Libertarian economists
Argentine anti-communists
1961 births
Living people
University of Buenos Aires alumni
People from Pergamino
Signers of the Madrid Charter
Members of the Argentine Chamber of Deputies elected in Buenos Aires Province
Leaders of political parties in Argentina